Alias Miss Dodd is a 1920 American comedy film directed by Harry L. Franklin and written by Charles J. Wilson. The film stars Edith Roberts, Walter Richardson, John Cook, Harry von Meter, Margaret McWade and Vida Johnson. The film was released on June 21, 1920, by Universal Film Manufacturing Company.

Cast         
Edith Roberts as Jeanne
Walter Richardson as Kent
John Cook as Thomas Dodd 
Harry von Meter as Jerry Dodd 
Margaret McWade as Sarah Ross
Vida Johnson as Bess
Ruth King as Hazel Jenkins

References

External links
 

1920 films
1920s English-language films
Silent American comedy films
1920 comedy films
Universal Pictures films
Films directed by Harry L. Franklin
American silent feature films
American black-and-white films
1920s American films